The 1965–66 Botola is the 10th season of the Moroccan Premier League. Wydad Casablanca are the holders of the title.

References

Morocco 1965–66

Botola seasons
Morocco
Botola